The 1808 United States Senate election in Massachusetts was held on June 2, 1808.

This unusually early election was called after incumbent Federalist John Quincy Adams broke with his party over the Embargo Act of 1807. The Federalist legislature elected State Senator James Lloyd, Jr. to the term beginning in March 1809.

Background
John Quincy Adams, son of former Federalist president John Adams, was elected senator by the Massachusetts legislature as a Federalist in 1803. His six-year term was scheduled to expire in March 1809.

However, Adams supported President Thomas Jefferson's foreign policy during the Napoleonic Wars, including the Louisiana Purchase and Embargo Act of 1807.  Adams was the lone Federalist in Congress to vote for the Non-importation Act of 1806. In response to Adams's continued distance from Federalist orthodoxy, the Federalist legislature in Massachusetts held this early election for the United States Senate term beginning in March 1809.

Election

Aftermath
Adams resigned immediately following his defeat, triggering a special election for the remainder of his term on June 9. Lloyd won the special election as well.

Adams soon formally joined the Democratic-Republicans and was appointed Minister to Russia by President James Madison.  Adams was later Secretary of State in the Cabinet of James Monroe and was elected President of the United States in 1824.

See also
Embargo Act of 1807

References

1808
Massachusetts
United States Senate
John Quincy Adams